Finlandia Lions is a university ice hockey team based in Hancock, Michigan. The school that is affiliated with the team is the Finlandia University. The team plays in the NCHA conference of NCAA D-III. They also have a women's team.

References 

Finlandia Lions
Finlandia University
NCAA Division III men's ice hockey tournament
2002 establishments in Michigan